Conostylis bealiana is a flowering plant in the family Haemodoraceae and is endemic to Western Australia.  It has green flat leaves and tubular dark yellow to orange-red flowers.

Description
Flowering occurs from July to September.

Taxonomy and naming
Conostylis bealiana was first formally described in 1875 by Ferdinand von Mueller and the description was published in Fragmenta Phytographiae Australiae. The specific epithet (bealiana) is in honour of Amy Beal.

Distribution and habitat
This conostylis grows in gravel, sand and sandy loam on the south coast of Western Australia.

References

Commelinales of Australia
Angiosperms of Western Australia
Plants described in 1875
Taxa named by Ferdinand von Mueller
bealiana